Erich Loest (24 February 1926 – 12 September 2013) was a German writer born in Mittweida, Saxony. He also wrote under the pseudonyms Hans Walldorf, Bernd Diksen and Waldemar Naß.

Life and career
He was a conscript soldier in World War II and a Nazi Party member, he was captured by US troops in 1945. 
In 1947 he joined the Socialist Unity Party of Germany and became a journalist for the Leipziger Volkszeitung. His first novels were heavily criticized, he was dismissed from the Volkszeitung and became a freelance writer. In 1957 he lost his SED membership and was held as a prisoner in a Stasi prison in Bautzen for "konterrevolutionärer Gruppenbildung (counter-revolutionary grouping)" until 1964, during which he was prohibited from writing.

From 1965 to 1975, he wrote eleven novels and 30 short stories, some under pseudonyms. In 1979 he was ostracized from East Germany and did not return until after the fall of the Berlin Wall in 1990.

In 1995, Frank Beyer directed the film Nikolaikirche, which was written, at first, as a screenplay by Loest, who later made it a novel. In his later years, Loest became seriously ill and announced at an Academy of Arts ceremony in 2010 that he did not have the strength to write another novel. On 12 September 2013, he committed suicide by jumping from a second-floor hospital window. He was 87 years old.

Works 

 Jungen, die übrig blieben, Leipzig 1950
 Nacht über dem See und andere Kurzgeschichten, Leipzig 1950 
 Liebesgeschichten, Leipzig 1951 
 Die Westmark fällt weiter, Halle (Saale) 1952
 Sportgeschichten, Halle (Saale) 1953
 Das Jahr der Prüfung, Halle (Saale) 1954
 Aktion Bumerang, Halle (Saale) 1957
 Sliwowitz und Angst, Berlin 1965
 Der Mörder saß im Wembley-Stadion, Halle (Saale) 1967 (pseudonym Hans Walldorf)
 Waffenkarussell, Berlin 1968 (pseudonym Hans Walldorf)
 Hilfe durch Ranke, Berlin 1968 (pseudonym Hans Walldorf)
 Der Abhang, Berlin 1968 
 Öl für Malta, Berlin 1968
 Der elfte Mann, Halle (Saale) 1969
 Gemälde mit Einlage, Berlin 1969 (pseudonym Hans Walldorf)
 Schöne Frau und Kettenhemd, Berlin 1969 (pseudonym Hans Walldorf) 
 Mit kleinstem Kaliber, Halle (Saale) 1973 (pseudonym Hans Walldorf)
 Schattenboxen, Berlin 1973
 Das Vorurteil, Berlin 1974 (pseudonym Bernd Diksen)
 Wildtöter und Große Schlange, Berlin 1974 
 Ins offene Messer, Berlin 1974 
 Eine Kugel aus Zink, Berlin 1974 (pseudonym Hans Walldorf) 
 Etappe Rom, Berlin 1975 
 Oakins macht Karriere, Berlin 1975
 Rotes Elfenbein, Halle (Saale) 1975 (pseudonym Hans Walldorf)
 Die Oma im Schlauchboot, Berlin 1976
 Ich war Dr. Ley, Berlin 1976 (pseudonym Waldemar Naß) 
 Es geht seinen Gang oder Mühen in unserer Ebene, Halle [u.a.] 1977 
 Rendezvous mit Syrena, Halle [u.a.] 1978 (together with Gerald Große)
 Pistole mit sechzehn, Hamburg 1979
 Swallow, mein wackerer Mustang, Berlin 1980
 Durch die Erde ein Riß, Hamburg 1981
 Harte Gangart, Köln 1983
 Völkerschlachtdenkmal, Hamburg 1984 
 Der vierte Zensor, Köln 1984
 Geordnete Rückzüge, Hannover 1984
 Herzschlag, Niddatal 1984 
 Zwiebelmuster, Hamburg 1985
 Leipzig ist unerschöpflich, Paderborn 1985 
 Saison in Key West, München [u.a.] 1986 
 Bruder Franz, Paderborn [u.a.] 1986 
 Ein Sachse in Osnabrück, Freiburg i. Br. 1986 
 Froschkonzert, München [u.a.] 1987
 Eine romantische Reise um die Welt, Künzelsau 1988
 Fallhöhe, Künzelsau 1989 
 Eine romantische Reise durch Europa, Künzelsau 1989 
 Bauchschüsse, Künzelsau 1990 
 Der Zorn des Schafes, Künzelsau 1990
 Die Stasi war mein Eckermann oder: mein Leben mit der Wanze, Göttingen 1991
 Heute kommt Westbesuch, Göttingen 1992 
 Katerfrühstück, Leipzig 1992
 Inseln der Träume, Künzelsau, 1993
 Zwiebeln für den Landesvater, Göttingen 1994 
 Nikolaikirche, Leipzig 1995 
 Als wir in den Westen kamen, Stuttgart  1997
 Gute Genossen, Leipzig 1999
 Reichsgericht, Leipzig 2001
 Träumereien eines Grenzgängers, Stuttgart 2001
 Werkausgabe, Künzelsau [u.a.]
 Bd. 1. Jungen, die übrig blieben, 1991
 Bd. 2. Der elfte Mann, 1992
 Bd. 3. Schattenboxen, 1993
 Bd. 4. Zwiebelmuster, 1994
 Bd. 5. Swallow, mein wackerer Mustang, 1996
 Bd. 6. Die Mäuse des Dr. Ley, 2000

See also 
 Bundesstiftung zur Aufarbeitung der SED-Diktatur
 Karl May
 List of East German authors
 List of German-language authors
 Literature of East Germany
 Literaturpreis der Universitätsstadt Marburg und des Landkreises Marburg-Biedenkopf

References

External links

1926 births
2013 suicides
People from Mittweida
Nazi Party members
Socialist Unity Party of Germany members
East German writers
Writers from Saxony
German male writers
German prisoners of war in World War II held by the United States
Commanders Crosses of the Order of Merit of the Federal Republic of Germany
Commanders of the Order of Merit of the Republic of Poland
Suicides by jumping in Germany
German Army personnel of World War II
2013 deaths